Justina Morcillo (born 9 August 2000) is an Argentine footballer who plays as a midfielder for Primera División A club River Plate and the Argentina women's national team.

International career
Morcillo made her senior debut for Argentina on 7 November 2019, in a 2–1 away friendly won against Paraguay.

References

External links

2000 births
Living people
Footballers from La Plata
Argentine women's footballers
Women's association football midfielders
Club Atlético River Plate (women) players
Argentina women's youth international footballers
Argentina women's international footballers